Barfly is a 1987 American comedy-drama film directed by Barbet Schroeder and starring Mickey Rourke and Faye Dunaway. The film is a semi-autobiography of poet/author Charles Bukowski during the time he spent drinking heavily in Los Angeles, and it presents Bukowski's alter ego Henry Chinaski. The screenplay, written by Bukowski, was commissioned by the Iranian-born Swiss film director Barbet Schroeder, and it was published (with illustrations by the author) in 1984, when film production was still pending.

The Kino Flo light, now a ubiquitous tool in the film industry, was specially created by Robby Müller's electrical crew for the bathroom scene with Henry and Wanda, which would have been difficult to light using the conventional lampheads available at the time.

The film was "presented by" Francis Ford Coppola and features a cameo by Bukowski. It was entered into the 1987 Cannes Film Festival, where it competed for the Palme D'or.

Plot 
 
Henry Chinaski is a destitute alcoholic who lives in a rundown apartment in Los Angeles and works menial jobs when he can find them. An intelligent man and keenly aware of his circumstance, he finds solace in expressing his feelings and perceptions of the world through writing poetry and short stories which he submits to magazines and papers for a few extra dollars.

Henry frequents a bar called The Golden Horn, where he drinks, hangs out with other down and out alcoholics, and gets into altercations with the tough guy bartender he hates, Eddie. One night, Henry gets into a fight with Eddie and loses. The next day, he delivers sandwiches to two patrons in the bar. Realizing he needs to eat before fighting (to gain energy) to win, he grabs the sandwich out of one of the patrons' hands and eats it, disgusting the patron and angering the bar owner, Jim, one of Henry's best friends. Jim tells Henry to go lie down in his apartment for a few hours. After an afternoon nap, Henry steals bread, bologna, and wine from another apartment to eat and drink in preparation to fight Eddie.

Henry returns to The Golden Horn later that evening, and antagonizes Eddie until he finally challenges him to another fight. Henry jumps over the bar and drinks beer out of the tap, infuriating Eddie. Jim puts a wager on Henry to beat Eddie. Henry wins the fight, and is then kicked out of the bar. Jim wins his bet, which he then gives to Henry so that he can buy a couple of drinks for the night.

Henry then staggers on to another establishment down the street called the Kenmore, where he continues his imbibement. There, he meets Wanda, a fellow alcoholic and a kept woman. Wanda is initially annoyed with Henry, telling him she "hates people," but is intrigued by his sarcastic and witty responses. The two buy liquor at a store across the street, and Wanda then steals corn from a cornfield, attracting the attention of the police. The two run to her apartment, evading them. Wanda boils the corn but discovers it is green and inedible, and then freaks out, saying that nothing in her life ever works out. Henry comforts her.

The next day, Henry sets out to get a job to finance their booze-soaked life together. Henry then takes Wanda back to The Golden Horn to meet Jim as well as to cash an income tax rebate he received working six months in a toy factory.

However, things become acrimonious between Henry and Wanda when Henry discovers that Wanda has slept with Eddie. After he chastises her for it, Wanda beats Henry with her purse, knocking him unconscious. Later, a detective following Henry sees him covered in blood and calls 911. Two paramedics arrive and are unfazed by Henry's being covered in blood, telling him not to waste their time. Wanda returns later, and the two apologize to one another. Later that night, Wanda claims to be dying in bed, seeing angels. Henry calls 911 and the same two paramedics arrive, much to his surprise, and they claim Wanda is just drunk and "too fat."

After Wanda leaves to look for a job the next morning, Henry is tracked down by Tully Sorenson, a wealthy female book publisher, who has been impressed with his writing and is interested in publishing some of his work. She finds him through the detective she has hired. Knowing Henry is destitute, Tully pays him an "advance" of $500. Henry then breaks into another apartment after hearing a man abusing his wife. After the man threatens to cut his wife's throat, he and Henry get into an altercation which results in the man being stabbed. Henry scrambles out of the apartment building and goes for a drive in L.A. with Tully. At one point, he rams a car where a man and woman are making out while the light is green. Tully tells him he was immature and reckless in his response. She then takes him back to her home where, after drinks, the two sleep together.

At first, Henry is impressed with the promise of wealth and security, including an endless supply of booze that working for Tully could provide. However, he begins to realize that he is uncomfortable being involved with Tully, romantically or professionally, because of class differences, telling her that she is "trapped in a cage with golden bars". Henry determines he must leave, that returning to his life of destitution and alcoholism is the only truth he knows.

After leaving Tully's house, Henry returns to his usual bar and to Wanda. Henry buys drinks for all of his "friends" at the bar. Eddie suspects Henry has no money and is itching for a fight, so he tells Henry that he owes him $40 for the drinks. To Eddie's surprise, Henry pays with some of the advance he received from Tully and sarcastically leaves a tip for Eddie, saying "Buy a drink on me." Tully heads out to see if she can change his mind, and finds him at the bar where a drunken, jealous Wanda proceeds to beat her up. When Henry does not intercede, Tully realizes that Henry does not care about her and does not want her help. So she leaves the bar and gives up on publishing his work, realizing that her pursuit of him was futile.

Eddie calls Henry out, and they go out behind the bar for another fight. As Henry and the other barflies follow Eddie out the door, the camera pans out to the front of the bar to the sound of punches and the crowd cheering the two men.

Cast 

 Mickey Rourke as Henry Chinaski
 Faye Dunaway as Wanda Wilcox
 Alice Krige as Tully Sorenson
 Jack Nance as Detective
 J.C. Quinn as Jim
 Frank Stallone as Eddie
 Sandy Martin as Janice
 Roberta Bassin as Lilly
 Gloria LeRoy as Grandma Moses
 Joe Unger as Ben
 Harry Cohn as Rick
 Pruitt Taylor Vince as Joe
 Fritz Feld as Bum
 Charles Bukowski as Oldtimer
 Albert Henderson as Louie

Production 
Charles Bukowski wanted Sean Penn to star as protagonist Henry Chinaski, but Penn insisted that Dennis Hopper direct the film.
Bukowski had written the screenplay for Barbet Schroeder, who had filmed him for French TV years before, but would not surrender the script to Hopper, whom he despised as a gold-chain-wearing Hollywood phony; Bukowski and Penn remained friends for the rest of Bukowski's life.

There is a scene where the camera tilts up over Faye Dunaway's legs. This glamour shot was done at her insistence and was not in the original screenplay.

The apartment building where Wanda's apartment is located was an actual building where Charles Bukowski and his lover Jane Cooney Baker, the real-life counterparts to Henry and Wanda, had lived. No one knew this until Bukowski, who was watching the filming, remembered.

The opening and closing song for the film is the 1967 instrumental "Hip Hug-Her" by Booker T. & the M.G.'s, released in their 1967 album.

Bukowski's reaction to the film 
Charles Bukowski had mixed reactions about the lead performance by Mickey Rourke. In an interview in the 2003 documentary film Born into This, Bukowski says that Rourke "didn't get it right... He had it all kind of exaggerated, untrue. He was a little bit showoff about it. So, no, it was kind of misdone.” Yet the original 1987 press kit for the film included a letter by Bukowski apropos the film, titled "A Letter from a Fan", in which the writer stated "Part of my luck was the actor who played Henry Chinaski. Mickey Rourke stayed with the dialogue to the word and the sound intended. What surprised me was that he added another dimension to the character, in spirit. Mickey appeared to really love his role, and yet without exaggeration he added his own flavor, his zest, his madness, his gamble to Henry Chinaski without destroying the intent or the meaning of the character. To add spirit to spirit can be dangerous but not in the hands of a damned good actor. Without distorting, he added, and I was very pleased with the love and understanding he lent to the role of the BARFLY". Bukowski had confided to the film critic Roger Ebert, in an interview conducted on the set of the film, that he thought Rourke was "doing a good acting job. I didn't really expect him to be so good."

Bukowski later novelized his experiences surrounding the film in the book Hollywood.

Reception 
Barfly received positive reviews from critics, holding a 76% rating on Rotten Tomatoes, based on 25 reviews.

Awards and honors 
 Nominee, Best Actress-Drama – Golden Globes (Faye Dunaway)
 Nominee, Palme d'Or – Cannes Film Festival
 Nominee, Best Cinematography – Independent Spirit Awards (Robby Müller)
 Nominee, Best Actor – Independent Spirit Awards (Mickey Rourke)

The film is recognized by American Film Institute in the following list:
 2002: AFI's 100 Years...100 Passions – Nominated

Popular culture connections 
 Barfly is referenced in the 2009 movie Precious.
 Other films based on the life or writings of Bukowski include Bukowski: Born into This (2003 documentary), Tales of Ordinary Madness (1981), Crazy Love (1987), and Factotum (2005).
 NOFX song, "Green Corn", released on Ribbed (1991), references Tully in the lyrics, "Tully, baby, you're trapped behind your golden bars; I'm the prince of poverty hangin' out in bars", and finishes with the lyrics, "maybe what we had was just green corn".
 In 2011, it was reported that actor and director James Franco was working on a movie version of Ham on Rye.
 The film was mentioned in a Season 5 episode of the television series Entourage. One of the show's characters, Johnny Drama (who plays an actor in the show), claims that he did three days as an extra on Barfly.
 A line of dialogue from the movie was used in a track titled "Only Angel" from Harry Styles' self-titled debut album.
 In an episode of the television series Mission Hill, Andy French mistakenly rents Barfly while seeking movies with notable vomit scenes.

References

External links 
 
 
 
 
 
 On Set article by Roger Ebert
 Charles Bukowski's Barfly: The Dignity and Depravity of Emotion by Jay Dougherty
 Barfly Quotes
 Barbet Schroeder, ombres et clarté de Jérôme d'Estais, Editions LettMotif, 2017

1987 comedy-drama films
1987 films
American comedy-drama films
1980s English-language films
Films about alcoholism
Films based on works by Charles Bukowski
Films directed by Barbet Schroeder
Films set in Los Angeles
Golan-Globus films
Films produced by Barbet Schroeder
1980s American films